Katrina Hodge (born 29 March 1987) is a former member of the British Army from Royal Tunbridge Wells, Kent in south-east England who was handed the Miss England 2009 title after Rachel Christie stepped down.

Biography
Born and raised in Tunbridge Wells, she was educated from age 15 at the BRIT School for Performing Arts and Technology in Croydon. Previously, she had attended Hillview School for Girls in Tonbridge.

Army career
Challenged by her older brother to join the army, she signed up aged 17. After basic training she was assigned to the Royal Anglian Regiment but as a member of the Adjutant Generals Corps.

She was deployed to Iraq in 2005. She rose to fame after it was reported in the British papers in 2005 that she had earned a commendation for her bravery whilst serving with the Royal Anglian Regiment in Iraq for wrestling two rifles from a prisoner following a road traffic accident. She was promoted to lance corporal.

Modelling

Hodge was signed up by lingerie firm La Senza in 2009. Originally she was the runner up in the 2009 Miss England competition, but became Miss England on 7 November 2009 when the pageant winner Rachel Christie stepped down after she was involved in a fight.  She only had 48 hours to prepare before taking part in the 59th Miss World pageant held in South Africa.

As Miss England, Hodge managed to persuade the organisers to remove the bikini round from the Miss England competition.  This, she said, would change people's views of beauty pageants, from being just about looks and more about the girl. Hodge said "To be Miss England you don't have to be the girl who looks best in a swimsuit, thankfully it's much more than that, it's about being a good role model".  The bikini round of the 2010 competition was removed and replaced with a sportswear round. Given six months leave by the Army, she was the front person for dating site Uniform Dating, which specifically aims to help uniformed personnel find love.

Return to army
Hodge handed over the Miss England crown to Jessica Linley in September 2010, and returned to active duty in the Army. After various training exercises, Hodge deployed to Afghanistan in early 2011

Quitting the army and abuse allegations
In 2015, Hodge decided to leave the army after reaching the rank of corporal in order to become a banker. In 2018, she revealed that she suffered from sexist abuse from her male colleagues during her deployment in Iraq, and kept receiving insulting messages from them even after her retirement.

Book
Hodge has a book called "Combats to Catwalk" which tells the story of how she went from army soldier to beauty queen.

References

1987 births
Living people
People from Royal Tunbridge Wells
People educated at the BRIT School
Adjutant General's Corps soldiers
English female models
Miss World 2009 delegates
Miss England winners
Women in the British Army
21st-century English women
21st-century English people